(P.O.V.: A Cursed Film) is a 2012 Japanese horror film directed by Norio Tsuruta.

Plot summary 
During a TV segment about ghost videos, television presenters experience a supernatural incident in a TV studio while one ghost video rolls. They trace the origins of the ghost video to a high school where they enter with camcorders to investigate the source of supernatural occurrences.

Cast 
 Haruna Kawaguchi
 Mirai Shida

References

2012 films
2012 horror films
Films directed by Norio Tsuruta
Japanese horror films
2010s Japanese films